Stevie Ray Vaughan Memorial is a bronze sculpture of Stevie Ray Vaughan by Ralph Helmick, in Austin, Texas, United States.

Description and history
Located at Auditorium Shores, Lady Bird Lake in Austin, it was fabricated in 1993 by Argos Foundry of Brewster, New York. The work was installed in 1994 and is maintained by Austin Parks & Recreation. It has become a popular tourist attraction, and often has flowers and other devotions at its base.

References

1994 establishments in Texas
1994 sculptures
Bronze sculptures in Texas
Cultural depictions of American men
Cultural depictions of country musicians
Monuments and memorials in Texas
Outdoor sculptures in Austin, Texas
Sculptures of men in Texas
Statues in Austin, Texas
Statues of musicians in the United States
Memorial